National Route 391 is a national highway of Japan connecting Kushiro, Hokkaidō and Abashiri, Hokkaidō in Japan, with a total length of 152.6 km (94.82 mi).

References

National highways in Japan
Roads in Hokkaido